The initial versions of the USB standard specified connectors that were easy to use and that would have acceptable life spans; revisions of the standard added smaller connectors useful for compact portable devices. Higher-speed development of the USB standard gave rise to another family of connectors to permit additional data paths. All versions of USB specify cable properties; version 3.x cables include additional data paths. The USB standard included power supply to peripheral devices; modern versions of the standard extend the power delivery limits for battery charging and devices requiring up to 100 watts. USB has been selected as the standard charging format for many mobile phones, reducing the proliferation of proprietary chargers.

Connectors 

The three sizes of USB connectors are the default or standard format intended for desktop or portable equipment, the mini intended for mobile equipment, which was deprecated when it was replaced by the thinner micro size, all of which were deprecated in USB 3.2 in favour of Type-C. There are five speeds for USB data transfer: Low Speed, Full Speed, High Speed (from version 2.0 of the specification), SuperSpeed (from version 3.0), and SuperSpeed+ (from version 3.1). The modes have differing hardware and cabling requirements. USB devices have some choice of implemented modes, and USB version is not a reliable statement of implemented modes. Modes are identified by their names and icons, and the specification suggests that plugs and receptacles be colour-coded (SuperSpeed is identified by blue).

Unlike other data buses (such as Ethernet), USB connections are directed; a host device has "downstream" facing ports that connect to the "upstream" facing ports of devices. Only downstream facing ports provide power; this topology was chosen to easily prevent electrical overloads and damaged equipment. Thus, USB cables have different ends: A and B, with different physical connectors for each. Each format has a plug and receptacle defined for each of the A and B ends. A USB cable, by definition, has a plug on each end—one A (or C) and one B (or C)—and the corresponding receptacle is usually on a computer or electronic device. The mini and micro formats may connect to an AB receptacle, which accepts either an A or a B plug, that plug determining the behavior of the receptacle.

Connector properties 

The connectors the USB committee specifies support a number of USB's underlying goals, and reflect lessons learned from the many connectors the computer industry has used. The connector mounted on the host or device is called the receptacle, and the connector attached to the cable is called the plug. The official USB specification documents also periodically define the term male to represent the plug, and female to represent the receptacle, though these uses are inconsistent with established definitions of connector gender.

By design, it is difficult to insert a USB plug into its receptacle incorrectly. The USB specification requires that the cable plug and receptacle be marked so the user can recognize the proper orientation. The USB-C plug however is reversible. USB cables and small USB devices are held in place by the gripping force from the receptacle, with no screws, clips, or thumb-turns as other connectors use.

The different A and B plugs prevent accidentally connecting two power sources. However, some of this directed topology is lost with the advent of multi-purpose USB connections (such as USB On-The-Go in smartphones, and USB-powered Wi-Fi routers), which require A-to-A, B-to-B, and sometimes Y/splitter cables. See the USB On-The-Go connectors section below for a more detailed summary description.

There are so-called cables with A plugs on both ends, which may be valid if the "cable" includes, for example, a USB host-to-host transfer device with two ports. This is, by definition, a device with two logical B ports, each with a captive cable, not a cable with two A ends.

Durability 
The standard connectors were designed to be more robust than many past connectors. This is because USB is hot-swappable, and the connectors would be used more frequently, and perhaps with less care, than previous connectors.

Standard USB has a minimum rated lifetime of 1,500 cycles of insertion and removal, the mini-USB receptacle increases this to 5,000 cycles, and the newer Micro-USB and USB-C receptacles are both designed for a minimum rated lifetime of 10,000 cycles of insertion and removal. To accomplish this, a locking device was added and the leaf-spring was moved from the jack to the plug, so that the most-stressed part is on the cable side of the connection. This change was made so that the connector on the less expensive cable would bear the most wear.

In standard USB, the electrical contacts in a USB connector are protected by an adjacent plastic tongue, and the entire connecting assembly is usually protected by an enclosing metal shell.

The shell on the plug makes contact with the receptacle before any of the internal pins. The shell is typically grounded, to dissipate static electricity and to shield the wires within the connector.

Compatibility 
The USB standard specifies tolerances for compliant USB connectors to minimize physical incompatibilities in connectors from different vendors. The USB specification also defines limits to the size of a connecting device in the area around its plug, so that adjacent ports are not blocked. Compliant devices must either fit within the size restrictions or support a compliant extension cable that does.

Pinouts 

USB 2.0 uses two wires for power (VBUS and GND), and two for differential serial data signals. Mini and micro connectors have their GND connections moved from pin #4 to pin #5, while their pin #4 serves as an ID pin for the On-The-Go host/client identification.

USB 3.0 provides two additional differential pairs (four wires, SSTx+, SSTx−, SSRx+ and SSRx−), providing full-duplex data transfers at SuperSpeed, which makes it similar to Serial ATA or single-lane PCI Express.

Colors 

USB ports and connectors are often color-coded to distinguish their different functions and USB versions. These colors are not part of the USB specification and can vary between manufacturers; for example, USB 3.0 specification mandates appropriate color-coding while it only recommends blue inserts for standard-A USB 3.0 connectors and plugs.

Connector types 

USB connector types multiplied as the specification progressed. The original USB specification detailed standard-A and standard-B plugs and receptacles. The connectors were different so that users could not connect one computer receptacle to another. The data pins in the standard plugs are recessed compared to the power pins so that the device can power up before establishing a data connection. Some devices operate in different modes depending on whether the data connection is made. Charging docks supply power and do not include a host device or data pins, allowing any capable USB device to charge or operate from a standard USB cable. Charging cables provide power connections, but not data. In a charge-only cable, the data wires are shorted at the device end, otherwise, the device may reject the charger as unsuitable.

Standard connectors 

 The type-A plug. This plug has an elongated rectangular cross-section, inserts into a type-A receptacle on a downstream port on a USB host or hub, and carries both power and data. Captive cables on USB devices, such as keyboards or mice, terminate with a type-A plug.
 The type-B plug: This plug has a near square cross-section with the top exterior corners beveled. As part of a removable cable, it inserts into an upstream port on a device, such as a printer. On some devices, the type-B receptacle has no data connections, being used solely for accepting power from the upstream device. This two-connector-type scheme (A/B) prevents a user from accidentally creating a loop.

Mini connectors 

Mini-USB connectors were introduced together with USB 2.0 in April 2000, for use with smaller devices such as digital cameras, smartphones, and tablet computers. The Mini-A connector and the Mini-AB receptacle connector have been deprecated since May 2007. Mini-B connectors are still supported, but are not On-The-Go-compliant; the Mini-B USB connector was standard for transferring data to and from the early smartphones and PDAs.

Micro connectors 

Micro-USB connectors, which were announced by the USB-IF on 4 January 2007, have a similar width to Mini-USB, but approximately half the thickness, enabling their integration into thinner portable devices.

The thinner Micro-USB connectors were intended to replace the Mini connectors in devices manufactured since May 2007, including smartphones, personal digital assistants, and cameras.

The Micro plug design is rated for at least 10,000 connect-disconnect cycles, which is more than the Mini plug design. The Micro connector is also designed to reduce the mechanical wear on the device; instead, the easier-to-replace cable is designed to bear the mechanical wear of connection and disconnection. The Universal Serial Bus Micro-USB Cables and Connectors Specification details the mechanical characteristics of Micro-A plugs, Micro-AB receptacles (which accept both Micro-A and Micro-B plugs), Double-Sided Micro USB, and Micro-B plugs and receptacles, along with a Standard-A receptacle to a Micro-A plug adapter.

OMTP standard
Micro-USB was endorsed as the standard connector for data and power on mobile devices by the cellular phone carrier group Open Mobile Terminal Platform (OMTP) in 2007.

Micro-USB was embraced as the "Universal Charging Solution" by the International Telecommunication Union (ITU) in October 2009.

In Europe, micro-USB became the defined common external power supply (EPS) for use with smartphones sold in the EU, and 14 of the world's largest mobile phone manufacturers signed the EU's common EPS Memorandum of Understanding (MoU). Apple, one of the original MoU signers, makes Micro-USB adapters available—as permitted in the Common EPS MoU—for its iPhones equipped with Apple's proprietary 30-pin dock connector or (later) Lightning connector. according to the CEN, CENELEC, and ETSI.

USB 3.x connectors and backward compatibility 

USB 3.0 introduced Type-A SuperSpeed plugs and receptacles as well as micro-sized Type-B SuperSpeed plugs and receptacles. The 3.0 receptacles are backward-compatible with the corresponding pre-3.0 plugs.

USB 3.x and USB 1.x Type-A plugs and receptacles are designed to interoperate. To achieve USB 3.0's SuperSpeed (and SuperSpeed+ for USB 3.1 Gen 2), 5 extra pins are added to the unused area of the original 4 pin USB 1.0 design, making USB 3.0 Type-A plugs and receptacles backward compatible to those of USB 1.0.

On the device side, a modified Micro-B plug (Micro-B SuperSpeed) is used to cater for the five additional pins required to achieve the USB 3.0 features (USB-C plug can also be used). The USB 3.0 Micro-B plug effectively consists of a standard USB 2.0 Micro-B cable plug, with an additional 5 pins plug "stacked" to the side of it. In this way, cables with smaller 5 pin USB 2.0 Micro-B plugs can be plugged into devices with 10 contact USB 3.0 Micro-B receptacles and achieve backward compatibility.

USB cables exist with various combinations of plugs on each end of the cable, as displayed below in the USB cables matrix.

USB On-The-Go connectors 

USB On-The-Go (OTG) introduces the concept of a device performing both master and slave roles. All current OTG devices are required to have one, and only one, USB connector: a Micro-AB receptacle. (In the past, before the development of Micro-USB, On-The-Go devices used Mini-AB receptacles).

The Micro-AB receptacle is capable of accepting both Micro-A and Micro-B plugs, attached to any of the legal cables and adapters as defined in revision 1.01 of the Micro-USB specification.

To enable Type-AB receptacles to distinguish which end of a cable is plugged in, plugs have an "ID" pin in addition to the four contacts in standard-size USB connectors. This ID pin is connected to GND in Type-A plugs, and left unconnected in Type-B plugs. Typically, a pull-up resistor in the device is used to detect the presence or absence of an ID connection.

The OTG device with the A-plug inserted is called the A-device and is responsible for powering the USB interface when required, and by default assumes the role of host. The OTG device with the B-plug inserted is called the B-device and by default assumes the role of peripheral. An OTG device with no plug inserted defaults to acting as a B-device. If an application on the B-device requires the role of host, then the Host Negotiation Protocol (HNP) is used to temporarily transfer the host role to the B-device.

OTG devices attached either to a peripheral-only B-device or a standard/embedded host have their role fixed by the cable, since in these scenarios it is only possible to attach the cable one way.

USB-C 

Developed at roughly the same time as the USB 3.1 specification, but distinct from it, the USB-C Specification 1.0 was finalized in August 2014 and defines a new small reversible-plug connector for USB devices. The USB-C plug connects to both hosts and devices, replacing various Type-A and Type-B connectors and cables with a standard meant to be future-proof.

The 24-pin double-sided connector provides four power–ground pairs, two differential pairs for USB 2.0 data (though only one pair is implemented in a USB-C cable), four pairs for SuperSpeed data bus (only two pairs are used in USB 3.1 mode), two "sideband use" pins, VCONN +5 V power for active cables, and a configuration pin for cable orientation detection and dedicated biphase mark code (BMC) configuration data channel. Type-A and Type-B adaptors and cables are required for older hosts and devices to plug into USB-C hosts and devices. Adapters and cables with a USB-C receptacle are not allowed.

Full-featured USB-C 3.1 cables are electronically marked cables that contain a full set of wires and a chip with an ID function based on the configuration data channel and vendor-defined messages (VDMs) from the USB Power Delivery 2.0 specification. USB-C devices also support power currents of 1.5 A and 3.0 A over the 5 V power bus in addition to baseline 900 mA; devices can either negotiate increased USB current through the configuration line or they can support the full Power Delivery specification using both BMC-coded configuration line and legacy BFSK-coded VBUS line.

All USB connectors except USB-C were deprecated with the release of USB 3.2.

Host and device interface receptacles 
USB plugs fit one receptacle with notable exceptions for USB On-The-Go "AB" support and the general backward compatibility of USB 3.0 as shown.

 Proprietary, hazardous Existing for specific proprietary purposes, not inter-operable with USB-IF compliant equipment and possibly damaging to both devices when plugged in. In addition to the above cable assemblies comprising two plugs, an "adapter" cable with a Micro-A plug and a standard-A receptacle is compliant with USB specifications. Other combinations of connectors are not compliant.There do exist A-to-A assemblies, referred to as cables (such as the Easy Transfer Cable); however, these have a pair of USB devices in the middle, making them more than just cables.
 Non-standard The USB standards do not exhaustively list all combinations with one A-type and one B-type connector, however, most such cables have good chances of working.
 OTG non-standard Commonly available "OTG" cables that address widespread misuse of Micro-B and Mini-B receptacles for OTG devices, e.g. smartphones (as opposed to Micro-AB and Mini-AB, which accept either plug.) While not compliant with the USB standards, these cables at least do not provide a device damage hazard since B-type ports on devices are unpowered by default.
 Deprecated Some older devices and cables with Mini-A connectors have been certified by USB-IF. The Mini-A connector is obsolete: no new Mini-A connectors and neither Mini-A nor Mini-AB receptacles will be certified.Note: Mini-B is not deprecated, although it is less and less used since the arrival of Micro-B. Micro-B is not the same as USB type B. Micro-B has one more wire than USB type B.

Proprietary connectors and formats 
Manufacturers of personal electronic devices might not include a USB standard connector on their product for technical or marketing reasons. Some manufacturers such as Apple provide proprietary cables that permit their devices to physically connect to a USB standard port. Full functionality of proprietary ports and cables with USB standard ports is not assured; for example, some devices only use the USB connection for battery charging and do not implement any data transfer functions.

Cabling 

The D± signals used by low, full, and high speed are carried over a twisted pair (typically unshielded) to reduce noise and crosstalk. SuperSpeed uses separate transmit and receive differential pairs, which additionally require shielding (typically, shielded twisted pair but twinax is also mentioned by the specification). Thus, to support SuperSpeed data transmission, cables contain twice as many wires and are thus larger in diameter.

The primary reason for this limit is the maximum allowed round-trip delay of about 1.5 μs. If USB host commands are unanswered by the USB device within the allowed time, the host considers the command lost. When adding USB device response time, delays from the maximum number of hubs added to the delays from connecting cables, the maximum acceptable delay per cable amounts to 26 ns.

Power 

Upstream USB connectors supply power at a nominal  via the V_BUS pin to downstream USB devices.

Voltage tolerance and limits 

The tolerance on V_BUS at an upstream (or host) connector was originally ±5% (ie. could lie anywhere in the range 4.75 V to 5.25 V). With the release of the USB Type-C specification in 2014 and its 3 A power capability, the USB-IF elected to increase the upper voltage limit to 5.5 V to combat voltage droop at higher currents. The USB 2.0 specification (and therefore implicitly also the USB 3.x specifications) was also updated to reflect this change at that time. A number of extensions to the USB Specifications have progressively further increased the maximum allowable V_BUS voltage: starting with 6.0V with USB BC 1.2, to 21.5 V with USB PD 2.0 and 50.9 V with USB PD 3.1, while still maintaining backwards compatibility with USB 2.0 by requiring various forms of handshake before increasing the nominal voltage above 5 V.

USB PD continues the use of the bilateral 5% tolerance, with allowable voltages of  ±5% ±0.5 V (eg. for a PDO of 9.0 V, the maximum and minimum limits are 9.95 V and 8.05 V, respectively).

There are several minimum allowable voltages defined at different locations within a chain of connectors, hubs, and cables between an upstream host (providing the power) and a downstream device (consuming the power). To allow for voltage drops, the voltage at the host port, hub port, and device are specified to be at least 4.75 V, 4.4 V, and 4.35 V respectively by USB 2.0 for low-power devices, but must be at least 4.75 V at all locations for high-power devices (however, high-power devices are required to operate as a low-powered device so that they may be detected and enumerated if connected to a low-power upstream port). The USB 3.x specifications require that all devices must operate down to 4.00 V at the device port.

Unlike USB 2.0 and USB 3.2, USB4 does not define its own VBUS-based power model. Power for USB4 operation is established and managed as defined in the USB Type-C Specification and the USB PD Specification.

Allowable current draw 

The limit to device power draw is stated in terms of a unit load which is 100 mA for USB 2.0, or 150 mA for SuperSpeed (ie USB 3.x) devices. Low-power devices may draw at most 1 unit load, and all devices must act as low-power devices before they are configured. A high-powered device must be configured, after which it may draw up to 5 unit loads (500 mA), or 6 unit loads (900 mA) for SuperSpeed devices, as specified in its configuration because the maximum power may not always be available from the upstream port.

A bus-powered hub is a high-power device providing low-power ports. It draws 1 unit load for the hub controller and 1 unit load for each of at most 4 ports. The hub may also have some non-removable functions in place of ports. A self-powered hub is a device that provides high-power ports by supplementing the power supply from the host with its own external supply. Optionally, the hub controller may draw power for its operation as a low-power device, but all high-power ports must draw from the hub's self-power.

Where devices (for example, high-speed disk drives) require more power than a high-power device can draw, they function erratically, if at all, from bus power of a single port. USB provides for these devices as being self-powered. However, such devices may come with a Y-shaped cable that has two USB plugs (one for power and data, the other for only power), so as to draw power as two devices. Such a cable is non-standard, with the USB compliance specification stating that "use of a 'Y' cable (a cable with two A-plugs) is prohibited on any USB peripheral", meaning that "if a USB peripheral requires more power than allowed by the USB specification to which it is designed, then it must be self-powered."

USB battery charging 

USB Battery Charging (BC) defines a charging port, which may be a charging downstream port (CDP), with data, or a dedicated charging port (DCP) without data. Dedicated charging ports can be found on USB power adapters to run attached devices and battery packs. Charging ports on a host with both kinds will be labelled.

The charging device identifies a charging port by non-data signaling on the D+ and D− terminals. A dedicated charging port places a resistance not exceeding 200 Ω across the D+ and D− terminals.

Per the base specification, any device attached to a standard downstream port (SDP) must initially be a low-power device, with high-power mode contingent on later USB configuration by the host. Charging ports, however, can immediately supply between 0.5 and 1.5 A of current. The charging port must not apply current limiting below 0.5 A, and must not shut down below 1.5 A or before the voltage drops to 2 V.

Since these currents are larger than in the original standard, the extra voltage drop in the cable reduces noise margins, causing problems with High Speed signaling. Battery Charging Specification 1.1 specifies that charging devices must dynamically limit bus power current draw during High Speed signaling; 1.2 specifies that charging devices and ports must be designed to tolerate the higher ground voltage difference in High Speed signaling.

Revision 1.2 of the specification was released in 2010. It made several changes, and increased limits including allowing 1.5 A on charging downstream ports for unconfigured devices—allowing High Speed communication while having a current up to 1.5 A. Also, support was removed for charging port detection via resistive mechanisms.

Before the Battery Charging Specification was defined, there was no standardized way for the portable device to inquire how much current was available. For example, Apple's iPod and iPhone chargers indicate the available current by voltages on the D− and D+ lines. When D+ = D− = 2.0 V, the device may pull up to 900 mA. When D+ = 2.0 V and D− = 2.8 V, the device may pull up to 1 A of current. When D+ = 2.8 V and D− = 2.0 V, the device may pull up to 2 A of current.

Accessory charging adaptors (ACA) 
Portable devices having a USB On-The-Go port may want to charge and access a USB peripheral simultaneously, yet having only a single port (both due to On-The-Go and space requirement) prevents this. Accessory charging adapters (ACA) are devices that provide portable charging power to an On-The-Go connection between host and peripheral.

ACAs have three ports: the OTG port for the portable device, which is required to have a Micro-A plug on a captive cable; the accessory port, which is required to have a Micro-AB or type-A receptacle; and the charging port, which is required to have a Micro-B receptacle, or type-A plug or charger on a captive cable. The ID pin of the OTG port is not connected within plug as usual, but to the ACA itself, where signals outside the OTG floating and ground states are used for ACA detection and state signaling. The charging port does not pass data, but does use the D± signals for charging port detection. The accessory port acts as any other port. When appropriately signaled by the ACA, the portable device can charge from the bus power as if there were a charging port present; any OTG signals over bus power are instead passed to the portable device via the ID signal. Bus power is also provided to the accessory port from the charging port transparently.

USB Power Delivery

In July 2012, the USB Promoters Group announced the finalization of the USB Power Delivery (USB-PD) specification (USB PD rev. 1), an extension that specifies using certified PD aware USB cables with standard USB Type-A and Type-B connectors to deliver increased power (more than 7.5 W) to devices with greater power demands. (USB-PD A and B plugs have a mechanical mark while Micro plugs have a resistor or capacitor attached to the ID pin indicating the cable capability.) USB-PD Devices can request higher currents and supply voltages from compliant hosts—up to 2 A at 5 V (for a power consumption of up to 10 W), and optionally up to 3 A or 5 A at either 12 V (36 W or 60 W) or 20 V (60 W or 100 W). In all cases, both host-to-device and device-to-host configurations are supported.

The intent is to permit uniformly charging laptops, tablets, USB-powered disks and similarly higher-power consumer electronics, as a natural extension of existing European and Chinese mobile telephone charging standards. This may also affect the way electric power used for small devices is transmitted and used in both residential and public buildings. The standard is designed to coexist with the previous USB Battery Charging specification.

The first Power Delivery specification defined six fixed power profiles for the power sources. PD-aware devices implement a flexible power management scheme by interfacing with the power source through a bidirectional data channel and requesting a certain level of electrical power, variable up to 5 A and 20 V depending on supported profile. The power configuration protocol can use BMC coding over the CC wire if one is present, or a 24 MHz BFSK-coded transmission channel on the VBUS line.

The USB Power Delivery specification revision 2.0 (USB PD Rev. 2.0) has been released as part of the USB 3.1 suite. It covers the USB-C cable and connector with a separate configuration channel, which now hosts a DC coupled low-frequency BMC-coded data channel that reduces the possibilities for RF interference. Power Delivery protocols have been updated to facilitate USB-C features such as cable ID function, Alternate Mode negotiation, increased VBUS currents, and VCONN-powered accessories.

As of USB Power Delivery specification revision 2.0, version 1.2, the six fixed power profiles for power sources have been deprecated. USB PD Power Rules replace power profiles, defining four normative voltage levels at 5 V, 9 V, 15 V, and 20 V. Instead of six fixed profiles, power supplies may support any maximum source output power from 0.5 W to 100 W.

The USB Power Delivery specification revision 3.0 defines an optional Programmable Power Supply (PPS) protocol that allows granular control over VBUS power, allowing a range of 3.3 to 21 V in 20 mV steps to facilitate constant-current or constant-voltage charging. Revision 3.0 also adds extended configuration messages and fast role swap and deprecates the BFSK protocol.

On 8 January 2018 USB-IF announced "Certified USB Fast Charger" logo for chargers that use "Programmable Power Supply" (PPS) protocol from the USB Power Delivery 3.0 specification.

In May 2021, the USB PD promoter group launched revision 3.1 of the specification. Revision 3.1 adds Extended Power Range (EPR) mode which allows higher voltages of 28, 36, and 48 V, providing up to 240 W of power (48 V at 5 A), and the "Adjustable Voltage Supply" (AVS) protocol which allows specifying the voltage from a range of 15 to 48 V in 100 mV steps. Higher voltages require electronically marked EPR cables that support 5 A operation and incorporate mechanical improvements required by the USB Type-C standard rev. 2.1; existing power modes are retroactively renamed Standard Power Range (SPR). In October 2021 Apple introduced a  140 W (28 V 5 A) GaN USB PD charger with new Macbooks.

Prior to Power Delivery, mobile phone vendors used custom protocols to exceed the 7.5 W cap on USB-BCS. For example, Qualcomm's Quick Charge 2.0 is able to deliver 18 W at a higher voltage, and VOOC delivers 20 W at the normal 5 V. Some of these technologies, such as Quick Charge 4, eventually became compatible with USB PD again.

Sleep-and-charge ports 

Sleep-and-charge USB ports can be used to charge electronic devices even when the computer that hosts the ports is switched off. Normally, when a computer is powered off the USB ports are powered down. This feature has also been implemented on some laptop docking stations allowing device charging even when no laptop is present. On laptops, charging devices from the USB port when it is not being powered from AC drains the laptop battery; most laptops have a facility to stop charging if their own battery charge level gets too low.

On Dell, HP and Toshiba laptops, sleep-and-charge USB ports are marked with the standard USB symbol with an added lightning bolt or battery icon on the right side. Dell calls this feature PowerShare, and it needs to be enabled in the BIOS. Toshiba calls it USB Sleep-and-Charge. On Acer Inc. and Packard Bell laptops, sleep-and-charge USB ports are marked with a non-standard symbol (the letters USB over a drawing of a battery); the feature is called Power-off USB. Lenovo calls this feature Always On USB.

Mobile device charger standards

In China 
, all new mobile phones applying for a license in China are required to use a USB port as a power port for battery charging. This was the first standard to use the convention of shorting D+ and D− in the charger.

OMTP/GSMA Universal Charging Solution 
In September 2007, the Open Mobile Terminal Platform group (a forum of mobile network operators and manufacturers such as Nokia, Samsung, Motorola, Sony Ericsson, and LG) announced that its members had agreed on Micro-USB as the future common connector for mobile devices.

The GSM Association (GSMA) followed suit on 17 February 2009, and on 22 April 2009, this was further endorsed by the CTIA – The Wireless Association, with the International Telecommunication Union (ITU) announcing on 22 October 2009 that it had also embraced the Universal Charging Solution as its "energy-efficient one-charger-fits-all new mobile phone solution," and added: "Based on the Micro-USB interface, UCS chargers will also include a 4-star or higher efficiency rating—up to three times more energy-efficient than an unrated charger."

EU smartphone power supply standard 

In June 2009, the European Commission organised a voluntary Memorandum of Understanding (MoU) to adopt micro-USB as a common standard for charging smartphones marketed in the European Union. The specification was called the common external power supply. The MoU lasted until 2014. The common EPS specification (EN 62684:2010) references the USB Battery Charging Specification and is similar to the GSMA/OMTP and Chinese charging solutions. In January 2011, the International Electrotechnical Commission (IEC) released its version of the (EU's) common EPS standard as IEC 62684:2011.

In 2022, the Radio Equipment Directive 2022/2380 made USB-C compulsory as a mobile phone charging standard from 2024, and for laptops from 2026.

Faster-charging standards 
A variety of (non-USB) standards support charging devices faster than the USB Battery Charging standard. When a device doesn't recognize the faster-charging standard, generally the device and the charger fall back to the USB battery-charging standard of 5 V at 1.5 A (7.5 W). When a device detects it is plugged into a charger with a compatible faster-charging standard, the device pulls more current or the device tells the charger to increase the voltage or both to increase power (the details vary between standards).

Such standards include:

 Qualcomm Quick Charge (QC)
 MediaTek Pump Express
 Samsung Adaptive Fast Charging
 Oppo Super VOOC Flash Charge, are also known as Dash Charge or Warp Charge on OnePlus devices and Dart Charge on Realme devices
 Huawei SuperCharge
 Anker PowerIQ
 Google fast charging
 Motorola TurboPower

Non-standard devices 

Some USB devices require more power than is permitted by the specifications for a single port. This is common for external hard and optical disc drives, and generally for devices with motors or lamps. Such devices can use an external power supply, which is allowed by the standard, or use a dual-input USB cable, one input of which is for power and data transfer, the other solely for power, which makes the device a non-standard USB device. Some USB ports and external hubs can, in practice, supply more power to USB devices than required by the specification but a standard-compliant device may not depend on this.

In addition to limiting the total average power used by the device, the USB specification limits the inrush current (i.e., the current used to charge decoupling and filter capacitors) when the device is first connected. Otherwise, connecting a device could cause problems with the host's internal power. USB devices are also required to automatically enter ultra low-power suspend mode when the USB host is suspended. Nevertheless, many USB host interfaces do not cut off the power supply to USB devices when they are suspended.

Some non-standard USB devices use the 5 V power supply without participating in a proper USB network, which negotiates power draw with the host interface. Examples include USB-powered keyboard lights, fans, mug coolers and heaters, battery chargers, miniature vacuum cleaners, and even miniature lava lamps. In most cases, these items contain no digital circuitry, and thus are not standard-compliant USB devices. This may cause problems with some computers, such as drawing too much current and damaging circuitry. Prior to the USB Battery Charging Specification, the USB specification required that devices connect in a low-power mode (100 mA maximum) and communicate their current requirements to the host, which then permits the device to switch into high-power mode.

Some devices, when plugged into charging ports, draw even more power (10 watts) than the Battery Charging Specification allows—the iPad is one such device; it negotiates the current pull with data pin voltages. Barnes & Noble Nook Color devices also require a special charger that runs at 1.9 A.

PoweredUSB 

PoweredUSB is a proprietary extension that adds four pins supplying up to 6 A at 5 V, 12 V, or 24 V. It is commonly used in point of sale systems to power peripherals such as barcode readers, credit card terminals, and printers.

See also
 USB (Communications)
 USB adapter

References

USB